Stirling and Falkirk Burghs was a parliamentary constituency represented in the House of Commons of the Parliament of the United Kingdom from 1918, comprising the burghs of Stirling, Falkirk and Grangemouth. It ceased to be a District of Burghs in 1950, but a constituency of the same name covering the same burghs continued in existence. In 1974 it became Stirling, Falkirk and Grangemouth. This was in turn abolished in 1983; it was the last British constituency (apart from those including islands) to consist of non-contiguous parts.

Boundaries

The Representation of the People Act 1918 provided that the constituency was to consist of the burghs of Stirling, Falkirk and Grangemouth.

Members of Parliament

Stirling and Falkirk (1918-1974)

Stirling, Falkirk and Grangemouth (1974-1983)

Elections

Elections in the 1970s

Elections in the 1960s

Elections in the 1950s

Elections in the 1940s

Elections in the 1930s

Elections in the 1920s

Elections in the 1910s

References 

Historic parliamentary constituencies in Scotland (Westminster)
Constituencies of the Parliament of the United Kingdom established in 1918
Constituencies of the Parliament of the United Kingdom disestablished in 1983
Politics of Falkirk (council area)
Politics of Stirling (council area)
Stirlingshire